Posht-e Tang-e Firuzabad (also Romanized as Posht-e Tang-e Fīrūzābād and Posht Tang-e Fīrūzābād; also known as Fīrūzābād Pass, Gardaneh-ye Fīrūzābād, Gardan-i-Fīrūzābād, Ja‘farābād, and Sar Fīrūzābād) is a village in Firuzabad Rural District, Firuzabad District, Selseleh County, Lorestan Province, Iran. At the 2006 census, its population was 91, in 17 families.

References 

Towns and villages in Selseleh County